, titled Line the Barbarian in English, is an independent OVT and Kyodai Hero series produced between 1990 and 2002 by veteran director/producer Yutaka Arai, with a total of 13 episodes, some of them being repeatedly altered over time. The series is about Line, a giant alien superhero similar in appearance to Ultraman, the only difference is that Line is silver and blue (as opposed to silver and red), and has a streamlined costume with musculature and a sharper alien-like face.  Like Ultraman and his kin, Line fights assorted rampaging giant monsters. The series features guest appearances by Hurricane Ryu, Yukijirō Hotaru and Eiichi Kikuchi.

To commemorate the 20th anniversary of the series in 2010, a digitally remastered edition was released on 3 DVDs, which is presented in widescreen, color corrected and provides additional scenes.

The series was also dubbed and released on VCD in Thailand. In Japan, the series was reissued on DVD on March 25, 2019. The reissues are presented in a single-length movie format rather than a show with individual episodes.

Episode list

Original episodes:
 "Burning Heart" (1987)
 "Survivor" (1989)
 "Self Control" (1990)
 "Stranger" (1991)
 "Soldier" (1992)
 "Savior" (1996)

Specials:
 "Line vs. Aqua" (1991)

2003 VHS/DVD release:
 "Self Control" 
 "The Monster Searchline"
 "The SAM Attack Cease Command" 
 "Decisive Battle MM21" 
 "The Seaside Capital Defense Directive"
 "Stand By Me"
 "The Great Monster Fierce Battle!!!"
 "The Woman That Came from the Cold Country"
 "The Star-Mark Shell"
 "The Illusionary All-Out War" (Part 1)
 "The Illusionary All-Out War" (Part 2)
 "Martial Law in Tokyo!"
 "Conflict of the Giant Gods!"

On the 2010 renewal edition, the "Illusionary All-Out War" two-part episodes were cut together.

DVD release dates

Original sale/rental release:
Vol. 1 (April 25, 2003, LINE-003)
Vol. 2 (April 25, 2003, LINE-004)
Vol. 3 (May 26, 2003, LINE-007)
Vol. 4 (May 26, 2003, LINE-008)
Issued by EDGE.

2010 remastered edition: 
Vol. 1 (August 14, 2010, MFVV-0021)
Vol. 2 (August 14, 2010, MFVV-0031)
Vol. 3 (August 14, 2010, MFVV-0041)
Issued by Magical Face.

2019 reprint:
Vol. 1 (May 25, 2019, RPPD-001)
Vol. 2 (May 25, 2019, RPPD-002)
Issued by Rapid Progress.

References

External links
Official Site
English-language Fan Site
New Official Site
DVD sales agency Site
Official YouTube channel

Tokusatsu